Jeffrey W. Bullock is the Secretary of State of Delaware, and Delaware's 80th Secretary of State. As Secretary of State, Bullock oversees over twenty different agencies, including the Division of Corporations, the Division of Historical and Cultural Affairs, the Division of the Arts, and the Division of Professional Regulation.

When Tom Carper served as Governor of Delaware, Bullock was his chief of staff. In 2006, New Castle County Executive Chris Coons appointed Bullock to be the county's chief administrative officer. Governor Jack Markell appointed Bullock as Secretary of State in January 2009.

Bullock is from Claymont, Delaware. Secretary Bullock holds a degree from the University of Delaware in Economics and Political Science. He and his wife, Susan, have two children, a dog, and a cat.

References

External links

 

1960 births
21st-century American politicians
Chiefs of staff to United States state governors
Delaware Democrats
Living people
People from Claymont, Delaware
Secretaries of State of Delaware